Abdul Matin Chowdhury (1944 – 4 August 2012) was a Bangladeshi politician. He served as the vice president and joint secretary general of Bangladesh Nationalist Party (BNP). He was appointed as the Minister of Home Affairs at the first Khaleda Zia cabinet during 1991–1996. He was elected to the Jatiya Sangsad four times since 1979.

Career
Chowdhury was a Muslim League politician before 1971. He was a member of the BNP's standing committee from 1991 to 2008.

Death 
Matin Chowdhury died on 4 August 2012.

References

1944 births
2012 deaths
People from Narayanganj District
Bangladesh Nationalist Party politicians
Home Affairs ministers of Bangladesh
Textiles and Jute ministers of Bangladesh
2nd Jatiya Sangsad members
5th Jatiya Sangsad members
6th Jatiya Sangsad members
8th Jatiya Sangsad members
Road Transport and Bridges ministers of Bangladesh